Kester Jacobs (born 28 July 1987) is a Guyanese international footballer who plays for Nishan'42 in the SVB Hoofdklasse, as a defender.

References

1987 births
Living people
Guyanese footballers
Guyanese expatriate footballers
Guyana international footballers
Guyana under-20 international footballers
Santos FC (Guyana) players
Alpha United FC players
Association football defenders
Expatriate footballers in Suriname
People from Essequibo Islands-West Demerara